The following are national holidays in Paraguay

All holidays in Paraguay can be moved by presidential decree, but there has to be a presidential decree for such a change. The following holidays are the exception (dates are fixed and to not change): January 1, May 14, December 8, December 25, Maundy Thursday and Good Friday.

References

 
Society of Paraguay
Paraguayan culture
Paraguay
Events in Paraguay